Royal Air Force Coltishall, more commonly known as RAF Coltishall , is a former Royal Air Force station located  North-North-East of Norwich, in the English county of Norfolk, East Anglia, which operated from 1939 to 2006.

It was a fighter airfield in the Second World War and afterwards, a station for night fighters then ground attack aircraft until closure.

After longstanding speculation, the future of the station was sealed once the Ministry of Defence announced that the Eurofighter Typhoon, a rolling replacement aircraft, displacing the ageing SEPECAT Jaguar, would not be posted there.  The last of the Jaguar squadrons left on 1 April 2006 and the station finally closed, one month early and £10 million under budget, on 30 November 2006.

The station motto was Aggressive in Defence. The station badge was a stone tower surmounted by a mailed fist grasping three bird-bolts (blunt arrows), which symbolised a position of strength in defence of the homeland, indicative of the aggressive spirit which Coltishall fighter aircraft were prepared to shoot down the enemy.

History

Second World War
Work on RAF Coltishall was started in February 1939.  The airfield, then known as Scottow Aerodrome, was initially built as a bomber station, on land near Scottow Hall.  Following the established tradition, the station would have been named after the nearest railway station, which would have made it "RAF Buxton", but to avoid possible confusion with the town of Buxton in Derbyshire, it was named after the local village of Coltishall instead.  The airfield was completed and entered service in May 1940 as a fighter base.  The first aircraft movement at Coltishall was a Bristol Blenheim IV L7835 flown by Sergeant RG Bales and Sergeant Barnes.

During the Second World War, Coltishall operated the Hawker Hurricane. A notable Coltishall fighter pilot was Douglas Bader, appointed as leader of No. 242 Squadron, a mainly Canadian Hurricane squadron. They had suffered significant losses in the recent Battle of France, and he was credited with restoring their morale.

Coltishall later became home to night fighters.  At the same time, the Royal Navy Fleet Air Arm operated aircraft from RAF Coltishall over the North Sea.  From 10 February to 7 April 1945 it was the airfield for No. 124 Squadron, at that time a fighter-bomber squadron flying Supermarine Spitfire IX.HF's, whilst the squadron was bombing V-2 launch sites in the Netherlands.  At the end of the war, Coltishall was briefly given over to Polish squadrons until they returned home.

Cold War
 
In the 1950s, RAF Coltishall was a designated a "V-Bomber dispersal airfield", which V bombers (the British nuclear deterrent) – the Avro Vulcan, Handley Page Victor and Vickers Valiant – could use in the event of their home station being damaged by enemy action.

Postwar, the station was home to a variety of units and aircraft including de Havilland Mosquitos, Gloster Javelins and – from 1963 – the "Historic Aircraft Flight" (now known as the Battle of Britain Memorial Flight). RAF Coltishall became home to the RAF's first English Electric Lightning F.1s when No. 74 (Fighter) Squadron began to receive the jet in June 1960, after arriving the year before. No. 74 (F) Squadron relocated to RAF Leuchars in Scotland on 2 March 1964. No. 226 Operational Conversion Unit (OCU) arrived at the base on 12 April 1964, tasked with training pilots how to fly the Lightning. The last Lightnings left Coltishall in September 1974 when No. 266 OCU departed.

The Lightnings were replaced by the Anglo-French SEPECAT Jaguar GR.1, with the first Jaguar unit, No. 54 (F) Squadron, arriving at Coltishall on 8 August 1974. They were soon joined by No. 6 Squadron who arrived at the base in November 1974, making the station exclusively home to the Jaguar in terms of fixed wing aircraft.

No. 41 (Designate) Squadron formed at RAF Coltishall on 1 October 1976 and worked up as a Jaguar unit until officially standing up on 1 April 1977, when the No. 41 Squadron operating the McDonnell Douglas Phantom FGR.2 at RAF Coningsby disbanded the previous day.

In 1990, all three based Jaguar units – Nos. 6, 41 and 54 Squadrons deployed to Muharraq Airfield, Bahrain, in preparation for Operation Granby due to Saddam Hussein's invasion of Kuwait.

Coltishall played host to several United States Air Force Coronet deployments during the Cold War:
 Coronet Heron – 12 to 23 June 1978 saw the deployment of 12 McDonnell Douglas RF-4C Phantom IIs from the 62nd Tactical Reconnaissance Squadron.
 Coronet Joust – 23 June to 7 July 1983 saw the deployment of 12 RF-4C Phantom IIs from the 106th Tactical Reconnaissance Squadron (Alabama ANG).
 Coronet Mobile – 13 to 26 September 1986 saw the deployment of 11 RF-4C Phantom IIs from the 106th Tactical Reconnaissance Squadron (Alabama ANG).

1991 to closure
The Jaguars deployed again, this time to Incirlik Air Base, Turkey, to participate in Operation Warden which set up a no-fly zone over Iraq. Between 1993 and 1995, the Jaguars deployed to Gioia del Colle Air Base, Italy, as part of Operation Deny Flight to enforce a no-fly zone over the Balkans. In 1997, No. 54 Squadron deployed to Italy once more in support of Operation Deliberate Guard. No. 6 Squadron deployed once again to Incirlik in 1998 as part of Operation Resinate.

No. 16 (Reserve) Squadron, the Jaguar OCU, arrived at RAF Coltishall from RAF Lossiemouth, Scotland, on 21 July 2000. In December 2000, five Jaguars from No. 41 (F) Squadron deployed to Luleå Airport, Sweden, to train alongside Saab 37 Viggens of the Norrbotten Wing.

Coltishall was also home to the yellow Search And Rescue (SAR) helicopters of No. 202 Squadron conducting air-sea rescue operations (Westland Sea King) and latterly No. 22 Squadron (Westland Wessex), but under subsequent reorganisation, the SAR operations were moved to RAF Wattisham, in Suffolk where they remained until 15 July 2015.

Coltishall eventually became the last surviving operational RAF airfield involved in the Battle of Britain other than RAF Northolt, and a visible remnant in the form of a Second World War revetment still stands on the North-West taxiway and, together with one of the two sets of 1950s blast walls, is now a scheduled monument.

With the anticipated arrival of the Eurofighter Typhoon in the RAF, the gradual retirement of the Jaguar force began.  Coltishall was not chosen as a future Typhoon airfield for a number of reasons, and so, with no future RAF role for Coltishall, the station was earmarked for closure.

The UK's Ministry of Defence, in the Delivering Security in a Changing World review, announced that the station would close by December 2006. The first two Jaguar squadrons to disband, No. 16 (R) Squadron and No. 54 (F) Squadron, did so on 11 March 2005. The final Jaguar squadrons departed on 1 April 2006, when No. 6 Squadron transferred to RAF Coningsby, but was subsequently disbanded on 31 May 2007 (to await delivery of the Eurofighter Typhoon at RAF Leuchars), and No. 41 (F) Squadron transferred to RAF Coningsby in OCU role. The final front line RAF movement from the station was by Jaguar XZ112, piloted by Jim Luke, on 3 April 2006.

Of the final gate guardians, the replica Hawker Hurricane was transferred to RAF High Wycombe, and the Jaguar was formally named the Spirit of Coltishall, and was subsequently transferred to the grounds of Norfolk County Council where she is dedicated to the memory of all those who served at Coltishall. The airfield is commemorated at the RAF Air Defence Radar Museum.

Some limited flying from light aircraft including those of the Coltishall Flying Club did continue after the end of RAF flying operations, until October 2006. While 1 April 2006 saw the disbandment parade for the station, it did not actually disband and finally close until 30 November 2006.  Associated facilities such as the Douglas Bader Primary School were also closed.  On the final day of the station the gates were opened to the public – anybody with photographic ID was welcomed onto the station to have a look around and view the final closing ceremony, which saw a flypast by four RAF Jaguars, and a solitary Hawker Hurricane from the Imperial War Museum Duxford.

On 30 November 2006, RAF Coltishall was officially handed over to Defence Estates (the MoD agency responsible for all UK Military sites) who are to handle the disposal of the site and will be formally known as MoD Coltishall until its ultimate disposal.

The site was sold to Norfolk County Council for £4 million.

Station commanders

Note: The ranks shown are the ranks held at the time of holding the appointment of commanding officer, Royal Air Force Coltishall.

Coltishall squadrons

No. 1 Squadron RAF; Spitfire LFIXb, F21
No. 6 Squadron RAF; Jaguar GR1/1A/1B, T2/T2A, GR3/3A, T4/T4A (November 1974 – April 2006)
No. 16 Squadron RAF (? – March 2005) (Squadron Standard now laid up in Notre-Dame Cathedral Saint-Omer, France)
No. 22 Squadron RAF; Beaufort I, II, Whirlwind HAR2, HAR10, Wessex HAR2
No. 23 Squadron RAF; Mosquito NF36, Vampire NF10, Venom NF2, NF3, Javelin FAW4, FAW7, FAW9R
No. 25 Squadron RAF; Mosquito VI, XVII, NFXXX
No. 26 Squadron RAF
No. 29 Squadron RAF; Beaufighter IF, VIF

No. 41 Squadron RAF; Javelin FAW4, Jaguar GR1/1A/1B, T2/T2A, GR3/3A, T4/T4A (1976 – April 2006)
No. 42 Squadron RAF; Beaufort I, II
No. 54 Squadron RAF; Jaguar GR1/1A/1B, T2/T2A, GR3/3A, T4/T4A (August 1974 – March 2005) (Squadron Standard now laid up in Norwich Cathedral)
No. 64 Squadron RAF; Spitfire I, Vb, LEVc
No. 66 Squadron RAF; Spitfire I
No. 68 Squadron RAF; Beaufighter IF, VI, Mosquito XVII, XIX, XXX
No. 72 Squadron RAF; Spitfire I
No. 74 Squadron RAF "Tigers"; Spitfire IIa, Hunter F6, Lightning F1, F3 (1940, 1960–1966)
No. 80 Squadron RAF; Tempest V
No. 93 Squadron RAF; Havoc I
No. 109 Squadron RAF
No. 118 Squadron RAF; Spitfire Vb
No. 124 Squadron RAF; Spitfire XI
No. 125 Squadron RAF; Mosquito XIV, XXX
No. 133 Squadron RAF; one of the American-piloted Eagle Squadrons formed 1941, Hurricane IIb
No. 137 Squadron RAF; Whirlwind I
No. 141 Squadron RAF; Mosquito NF36, Meteor NF11, Venom NF3, Javelin FAW4
No. 151 Squadron RAF; Hurricane I, IIb, IIc, Defiant I
No. 152 Squadron RAF; Spitfire IIa
No. 154 Squadron RAF; Spitfire Va, Vb
No. 195 Squadron RAF; Typhoon Ib
No. 202 Squadron RAF; Whirlwind HAR10, Sea King HAR3
No. 222 Squadron RAF; Spitfire Ia, IIa, IIb
No. 226 Squadron RAF OCU; Lightning F1, F1A, F3, T4, T5, T55
No. 228 Squadron RAF; Whirlwind HAR10
No. 228 Squadron RAF OCU; Mosquito (various), Meteor (various)
No. 229 Squadron RAF; Spitfire XI, XVI
No. 234 Squadron RAF; Spitfire Vb, Vc
No. 242 Squadron RAF; Hurricane I
No. 255 Squadron RAF; Beaufighter IIF
No. 257 Squadron RAF; Hurricane I, IIa, IIb, IIc
No. 264 Squadron RAF; Mosquito NF36
No. 266 Squadron RAF; Typhoon Ia, Ib
No. 274 Squadron RAF; Tempest V
No. 275 Squadron RAF; Sycamore HR13, HR14
No. 278 Squadron RAF; Lysander IIa, Walrus I, II, Anson I
No. 288 Squadron RAF; Hurricane I, Defiant TT II/III
No. 303 Polish Fighter Squadron; Spitfire IX, Mustang IV (1944, 1945)
No. 306 Polish Fighter Squadron; Mustang III
No. 307 Polish Night Fighter Squadron; Mosquito XXX
No. 309 (Polish) Squadron; Mustang III, IV
No. 312 (Czechoslovak) Squadron RAF; Spitfire XI
No. 315 (Polish) Squadron; Mustang III
No. 316 (Polish) Squadron; Mustang III
No. 318 (Polish) Squadron RAF; Spitfire IX
No. 409 Squadron RCAF; Beaufighter VI
No. 453 Squadron RAAF; Spitfire IX
No. 488 Squadron RNZAF; Beaufighter II
No. 602 Squadron RAF; Spitfire IX, XVI
No. 603 Squadron RAF; Spitfire XVI (1945)
No. 604 Squadron RAF; Beaufighter I
No. 610 Squadron RAF; Spitfire Vb, Vc
No. 611 Squadron RAF; Spitfire IX
No. 616 Squadron RAF; Spitfire I
809 Naval Air Squadron; Sea Hornet F20, NF21
819 Naval Air Squadron;
841 Naval Air Squadron; Albacore I, Swordfish I, II
849 Naval Air Squadron; Gannett AEW3, COD4, T5

Units
The following units were here at some point:

Redevelopment
The former married quarters were transferred to the MoD's preferred property agents, Annington Homes, who started the lengthy process of upgrading the former military housing into civilian houses for sale on the open market.

During January 2007, the Home Office expressed an interest in the site, and in early February earmarked it for potential use as an immigration detention facility, but this was subsequently ruled out.

In July 2007, a petition was set up on the 10 Downing St website to campaign for Coltishall to be reopened as a civil airfield.

In December 2007, fresh reports in the media suggested the site would be used as a prison, but this angered local residents who had not been informed of the disposal progress.

In January 2009, a plan to build a Category C prison at the site was approved by North Norfolk District Council. The site is now under the control of the Ministry of Justice (MoJ) and building works to convert all of the former H-blocks along with the completion of the dual perimeter fences, and a new access road began in 2009.  The new establishment known as HMP Bure, named after a nearby river, can house over 500 male sex offenders.

On 19 July 2010, North Norfolk District Council proposed that the entire site should be designated as a conservation area (United Kingdom) because of its historical and architectural interest.

In 2013, Scottow Enterprise Park was opened on part of the site, taking up approximately 600 acres of the former RAF base. Its repurposed military buildings are now home to tenants in industries from construction to film.

In April 2015, Scottow Moor Solar Limited built a 32 MW solar farm on the site. In April 2016, another 18 MW of solar panels were added, bringing the solar farm's total capacity to 50 MW.

In June 2019, A British aircraft manufacturer is now based at the airfield. Swift Aircraft have been allowed to produce up to 98 planes a year and use the runway for 8 flights a day by the local government. This will employ roughly 100 local people and greatly benefit the local economy.

Heritage

Station badge and motto 
RAF Coltishall's badge, awarded in January 1953, features a fortified tower with a clenched gauntlet holding three blue arrows (bird bolts). The tower relates to the strength in defence of the station. The gauntlet and arrows represent the fighter aircraft based at the station and their aggressive nature.

The station's motto is "Aggressive in defence".

Gate guardians 

Prior to closure, Coltishall had two gate guardians. The first was a Jaguar S which was an airframe formed from various Jaguars, including the front fuselage of 'XW563'. It arrived from RAF Brüggen in 2001 and was on display at the main gate until February 2007 when it was relocated to Norwich County Hall.

A replica fibreglass Hawker Hurricane was on display beside the guard room from 1989 until it was relocated to RAF High Wycombe in October 2006.

Built heritage 
In September 2010, RAF Coltishall was designated as a conservation area by North Norfolk District Council and Broadland District Council.

Parts of the airfield were designated as scheduled monuments in March 2008. The designation covers a single Second World War era fighter pen and eight pairs of Cold War era blast walls dating from the 1950s. Historic England describes the blast walls as rare and outstandingly well preserved.

The former Officers' Mess was designated as a grade II listed building in October 2017. The neo-Georgian style building was built between 1939 and 1940.

See also
List of Battle of Britain airfields
List of former Royal Air Force stations

References

Citations

Bibliography

 Jennings, Mick MBE. Royal Air Force Coltishall, Fighter Station. A Station History. Cowbit, Spalding, Lincolnshire, UK: Old Forge Publishing, 2007. .

 Sullivan, Wing Commander John MBE, MSc, RAF. Big Cat Diary: The Last Year of the Jaguar with 6 Squadron RAF. Published by the author, 2008. .

External links

RAF Coltishall – A Photographic Characterisation by English Heritage
RAF Coltishall – Conservation Area Appraisal
The Spirit of Coltishall Association

Military units and formations established in 1940
Royal Air Force stations in Norfolk
Royal Air Force stations of World War II in the United Kingdom
Airports in England
Military units and formations disestablished in 2006